Phaecasiophora rufata is a moth of the family Tortricidae. It is found in Vietnam.

The wingspan is about 19 mm. The ground colour of the forewings is yellow brown, along the distal third of the costal it is slightly tinged with pinkish and it is suffused brown dorsally. The hindwings are brownish.

Etymology
The name refers to colouration of forewing and is derived from Latin rufata (meaning tinged rust).

References

Moths described in 2009
Olethreutini
Moths of Asia
Taxa named by Józef Razowski